On the Road is the third studio album by American country music singer Lee Roy Parnell. It was released October 26, 1993 via Arista Nashville. The album produced four singles for Parnell, all of which charted on Billboard Hot Country Songs: the title track at #6, "I'm Holding My Own" at #3, a cover of the Hank Williams song "Take These Chains from My Heart" at #17, and "The Power of Love" at #51.

Track listing

Production
Produced & Mixed By Scott Hendricks
Engineered By Scott Hendricks, John Kunz & Mark Capps
Mastered By Hank Williams
Project Assistant: John Kunz
Project Administrator: Ramona Simmons

Personnel
Drums: Lonnie Wilson
Congas, cymbals: Terry McMillan
Bass guitar: Glenn Worf
Piano, Wurlitzer: John Barlow Jarvis
Hammond organ: Reese Wynans
Acoustic guitar: Billy Joe Walker Jr.
Electric guitar: Lee Roy Parnell, John Jorgenson, James Pennebaker
Slide guitar: Lee Roy Parnell
Steel guitar: Dan Dugmore
Mandolin: John Jorgenson
Harmonica: Rob Parnell
Lead vocals: Lee Roy Parnell
Backing vocals: Joy Lynn White, Jonell Mosser, Jimmy Hall, Steve Mackey, Russell Smith, Dennis Wilson, Harry Stinson
Guest vocals: Ronnie Dunn on "Take These Chains from My Heart"

Chart performance

1993 albums
Albums produced by Scott Hendricks
Arista Records albums
Lee Roy Parnell albums